John Smith (1770–1816) was a clockmaker born in Pittenweem, Fife, Scotland.

His most famous clock is in the possession of the Duke of Buccleuch. It is reported to have four dials and shows days of the week and days of the month. The clock can play eight old Scots tunes and every three hours initiates a procession where the Macer of the Lords of Council and Session appears, doffs his cap and then leads fifteen Lords in ceremonial robes across an opening, before re-appearing and replacing his cap. At midnight on Saturday, a plaque appears bearing the legend "Remember Sunday". On Sunday the clock neither strikes nor processes, resuming at midnight.
John Smith of Pitenweem was a superb ingenious craftsman and his clocks generally were of the highest quality. For such a talented clockmaker to come from a small secluded fishing village in Scotland this is no mean achievement. An advertisement is issued by himself in the year 1775, which he informs us, " he was bred in the trade and had never been out of the country."

References 

 J.Smith," Old Scottish Clockmakers", (UK)

External links
 John Smith Pittenweem Longcase Clock C.1790

Scottish clockmakers
People from Pittenweem
1770 births
1816 deaths